Yevgeny Olegovich Komarovsky (born October 15, 1960, Kharkiv, Ukrainian SSR, USSR) is a Ukrainian pediatrician, doctor of the highest category, writer, TV presenter.

Biography
Yevgeny Olegovich Komarovsky was born in 1960 in Kharkiv into a family of engineers. His mother is Jewish, his father is Ukrainian. He graduated from Kharkiv National Medical University (Pediatric Faculty).

In 1983 he started work in the regional Kharkiv infant clinical hospital, in the intensive care unit. From 1991 until 2000, he was head of the infectious department. Since 1996, Candidate of Medical Sciences. He is the author of numerous scientific works, as well as popular science articles and books.

In March 2010, the project  started on the Ukrainian television channel Inter. From February 25, 2017, he conducted the Medicine Show on Russkoye Radio.
Since February 24, 2022, Dr. Komarovsky has worked tirelessly in Kharkiv infant clinic and elsewhere, caring for as many individuals as possible under dire conditions. He has also become a vocal spokesperson for peace and a return to sanity, with frequent appearances on youTube.

Political career
On April 17, 2019, Komarovsky joined the presidential candidate's team of 2019, Volodymyr Zelensky. But the same year he discontinued his relationship with Zelensky.

On November 9, 2021, he said there should be three official languages in the country: Ukrainian, Russian, English.

Personal life
He is married to his wife Yekaterina who is an ophthalmologist. They have two sons. Komarovsky enjoys ice fishing, literature, music and tourism.

References

External links 
 Автобиография доктора Комаровского
 Доктор Комаровский. Гордон (2019)
  Dr. Komarovsky speaks with Popular Politics 28 Feb 2022- English subtitles

1960 births
Living people
Writers from Kharkiv
Soviet pediatricians
Ukrainian paediatricians
Inter (TV channel) people
Ukrainian television presenters
Ukrainian radio presenters
Kharkiv National Medical University people
21st-century Ukrainian physicians
Ukrainian bloggers
Ukrainian YouTubers